Kutz Mill is a historic grist mill complex located on Sacony Creek in Greenwich Township, Berks County, Pennsylvania.  It is adjacent to the Kutz's Mill Bridge.  The complex includes the 1 1/2-story, stone mill (c. 1850); brick farmhouse (1855); 1 1/2-story, stone summer kitchen; stone and frame Pennsylvania German bank barn; and three frame outbuildings.  The mill is representative of a country custom mill and built as part of a working farm.

It was listed on the National Register of Historic Places in 1990.

References

Grinding mills in Berks County, Pennsylvania
Grinding mills on the National Register of Historic Places in Pennsylvania
Industrial buildings completed in 1850
Houses in Berks County, Pennsylvania
National Register of Historic Places in Berks County, Pennsylvania
1850s establishments in Pennsylvania